Spirit Warriors may refer to:

 Spirit Warriors (TV series), a BBC children's adventure series
 Spirit Warriors (film), a 2000 Filipino fantasy-horror film